João Duarte Vieira Pereira (born 10 May 1990) is a Portuguese professional footballer who plays for S.C.U. Torreense as a central defender.

Club career
Born in Cartaxo, Santarém District, Pereira started playing football in 2001 at Sport Lisboa e Cartaxo, a subsidiary club of S.L. Benfica. He represented the former for three years, until he was called up by the latter to finish his development.

After signing a professional contract, Pereira trained with the first team at Benfica Campus in Seixal, but also in the pre-season tour of Nyon. Upon arriving in Switzerland, he was loaned to C.D. Fátima for one year, making his professional debut on 20 September by playing the full 90 minutes in a 1–2 home loss against S.C. Beira-Mar. He appeared in 24 games and scored once in each of his two seasons in the Segunda Liga, helping to a best-ever eighth place in 2009–10.

In June 2011, Pereira opted to terminate his contract with Benfica and sign a two-year deal with Beira-Mar. He would never appear for the team in a competitive game, being loaned the following month to C.D. Trofense also from the second division. In December, he agreed to a three-and-a-half-year deal with FC Sheriff Tiraspol.

Pereira made his Moldovan National Division debut on 3 March 2012, playing as left back and providing an assist in a 2–0 away win over FC Costuleni, going on to contribute to the club's eleventh league title. He moved teams in countries again in January 2013, joining FC Nordsjælland from Denmark, after winning another league medal with Sheriff.

In late August 2013, after failing to receive any playing time, Pereira signed a six-month contract with Danish second tier club Vejle BK. He extended his link in November for another six months, and again in April 2014 for another year.

Pereira moved to SønderjyskE Fodbold in June 2015. In January of the following year, website Bold announced that fellow Danish Superliga side Odense Boldklub had signed him for the 2016–17 campaign.

International career
Pereira earned 49 caps for Portugal, across all youth levels. He played seven times for the under–16 team, helping them win the Santarém Tournament in February 2006 and finish seventh in the Montaigu Tournament in April. Later in the year, he participated in the Nike Tournament with the under–17s, also competing in the Algarve International Tournament in February 2007.

Pereira represented the under-19 team during the Ireland Tournament in August 2008, the La Manga Tournament in February 2009 and the Porto Tournament in April. Additionally, he played in the two qualifying rounds for the 2009 UEFA European Under-19 Championship, but the nation did not qualify.

On 9 February 2011, Pereira first appeared with the under-21 side, starting in a 3–1 friendly victory over Sweden in his hometown. His only international goal arrived on 1 September of that year during a 2–0 away defeat of Moldova for the 2013 European Championship qualifiers, in which Portugal finished in second thus failing to progress to the finals.

Career statistics

References

External links

1990 births
Living people
People from Cartaxo
Sportspeople from Santarém District
Portuguese footballers
Association football defenders
Liga Portugal 2 players
Campeonato de Portugal (league) players
S.L. Benfica footballers
C.D. Fátima players
S.C. Beira-Mar players
C.D. Trofense players
S.C.U. Torreense players
Moldovan Super Liga players
FC Sheriff Tiraspol players
Danish Superliga players
Danish 1st Division players
FC Nordsjælland players
Vejle Boldklub players
SønderjyskE Fodbold players
Odense Boldklub players
Portugal youth international footballers
Portugal under-21 international footballers
Portuguese expatriate footballers
Expatriate footballers in Moldova
Expatriate men's footballers in Denmark
Portuguese expatriate sportspeople in Moldova
Portuguese expatriate sportspeople in Denmark